This is a list of animated films, television serials and programmes related to Islamic civilisation, i.e. Islam, Islamic history and Islamic culture.

Short films
1001 Inventions and the World of Ibn Al-Haytham (2015), on medieval Muslim scientist Ibn al-Haytham.
Who Won? (2018), on boxer Muhammad Ali by Aisha Selime Coskun.

Films

Religious
The Boy and the King (Egypt, 1992) a fictional retelling of the story of the historical event of the People of the Ditch (described in Surah Al-Buruj and  Prophetic traditions).
Habil & Qabil (2003), a retelling of the Islamic account of Cain and Abel.
Bilal: A New Breed of Hero (UAE, 2015) a retelling of the story of Bilal ibn Rabah, a companion of the Prophet and first Muezzin in Islam.
Dajjal: The Slayer and His Followers (Pakistan, 2018) thriller film based on Islamic traditions regarding the Antichrist, known as Dajjal.

Badr International
Muhammad: The Last Prophet (2002), the classic children's retelling of the life of the Last Prophet Muhammad.
Before The Light (2012), a retelling of events in  Arabia before the birth of Muhammad, with his grandfather, Abdul-Muttalib, as the main character.
Great Women of Islam (2012), describing the roles of women in Arabia before and after the birth of Islam.
Salman the Persian (2012), a retelling of the beloved story of  Salman's quest for religious enlightenment.

Islamic History 
Fatih Sultan Muhammad (Turkey, 1983) on the Conquest of Constantinople by Ottoman Sultan Mehmet II.
The Lion of Ain-Jaloot (1999), a children's retelling of the Battle of Ain Jalut between the  Mongols and the Muslims led by  Mamluk Sultan  Saif ad-Din Qutuz.
God's Faithful Servant: Barla (Turkey, 2011) on the life of  Bediüzzaman Said Nursi.
Princess of Rome (Iran, 2015) on the life of  Nargis Khatoon, mother-to-be of Muhammad al-Mahdi, the 12th Shia Imam.
Musab bin Umeyr
Tariq bin Ziad
Fatih Sultan Mehmet and Two Priests

Islamic Culture 
Tuva: The Wealth of Salah
Hay Bin Yeksan (1992), based on the medieval novel Hayy ibn Yaqzan.
The Jar: A Tale From the East (Syria, 2001)
Fables of Bah Ya Bah (2001) and Fables of Bah Ya Bah 2 (2004)
Olive Dreams (2009)
The Breadwinner (2017)

Salam Series 
Salam and the Knights of Virtue
Salam and the Golden Queen
Salam's Journey

Television/Web Series

JCC & Cairo Cartoon 

 Men Qasas Al Saleheen (English: from the tales of the Righteous), a series telling the stories of famous righteous people
 Olamaa Al Moslemin (English: Muslim Scientists), the biopic series of muslim scientists
 Men Qasas Et Tabiin (English: from the biograpy of the Successors), the series feutures the biography of multiple Tabiun

Cedars Art Production 

 Women Stories from Qur'an
 Animal Stories from Holy Qur'an
 Human Stories from Qur'an
 Marvellous Stories from Qur'an
 Verses Stories from Qur'an

Cartoonile & One Way Production 

 Imam Bukhari Series

ATA Animation Studios 

 Habib Allah, a 3-season television series featuring the biography of Muhammad.
 Joseph Alsideeq, a series featuring his life story
 Kaleem Allah, a 3-season television series featuring the biography of Moses. 
 Khalil Allah, a tv series featuring Ibrahim.
 Noah, a series featuring his life story.
 Solaiman Al Hakeem, a television series that revolves around the story of Solomon 
 El Kahf, the series tells the stories in Surah Al-Kahf (Quran, chapter 18) 

 Muslim Kids TV 

 Al Qasas, a retelling of the stories of the quran in a manner catered to children. 
 Mama and Lulu, a television series following Lulu and her mother on a journey of learning and ethics.
 Lulu around the world, follows Lulu around the world as she shares interesting facts, history and Landmarks.

 Other Notables Adam's World, television series using Muppets to teach children good Islamic morals and values.
 One4Kids: Zaky & FriendsSaladin: The Animated Series (Malaysia, 2009) on Saladin and the Crusades.
 Ibn Battuta: The Animated Series (Malaysia, 2010) on the travels of Ibn Battuta.
 Burka Avenger (Pakistan, 2013)
 Sophie and the Supply Crew''

See also
 List of Islamic films
 Muhammad in film

References

Islamic
Islamic animated films
animated films
Television series about Islam